Hugo Jesús Jamioy Juagibioy (born 1971) is a Colombian poet and storyteller. He is an indigenous person from Colombia, who belongs to the Kamëntsa people.

Background
Jamioy was born in Waman Tabanók (which translated to "Our sacred place of origin"), located in the Valley of Sibundoy, Putumayo department.

Education
Jamioy has studied Agronomic Engineering at the University of Caldas.

Career
The Colombian Ministry of Culture awarded Jamioy a National Research Grant in 2006. In 2013, he participated in the Smithsonian Institution's Folklife Festival in Washington, D.C.

Published works
 Mi fuego y mi humo, mi tierra y mi sol (1999). Infección Editores, Facultad de Derecho Ciencias Jurídicas y Sociales, Dirección de Bienestar Universitario, Universidad Nacional de Colombia, Bogota.
 No somos gente (2000) edition from the author. 2000.
 Bínÿbe Oboyejuayëng. Danzantes del Viento (2010).  Bogota: Ministerio de Cultura.

See also

 List of writers from peoples indigenous to the Americas
 Camsá language

Notes

References
 Cibreiro, Estrella and Francisca López. Global Issues in Contemporary Hispanic Women Writers. Routledge, 2012. .

External links
 Lo puro, vida del futuro (Hugo Jamioy, Kamsá, Colombia), video

1971 births
Colombian people of indigenous peoples descent
20th-century Colombian poets
Colombian male poets
Indigenous writers of the Americas
Living people
People from Putumayo Department
Postmodern writers
21st-century Colombian poets
20th-century male writers
21st-century male writers